The Oakland Long Wharf was an 11,000-foot railroad wharf and ferry pier along the east shore of San Francisco Bay located at the foot of Seventh Street in West Oakland. The Oakland Long Wharf was built, beginning 1868, by the Central Pacific Railroad on what was previously Oakland Point. Beginning November 8, 1869, it served as the west coast terminus of the First transcontinental railroad.  In the 1880s, Southern Pacific Railroad took over the CPRR, extending it and creating a new ferry terminal building with the official station name Oakland Pier.  The entire structure became commonly and popularly called the Oakland Mole. Portions of the Wharf lasted until the 1960s.  The site is now part of the facilities of the Port of Oakland, while passenger train service operates at the nearby Jack London Square/Dellums Station and another nearby station in Emeryville.

History

The first use of the site for boats was in 1852, when Gibbons' Wharf was constructed at Gibbons' Point, westward into San Francisco Bay. In 1862, Gibbons' Point was renamed Oakland Point, and the wharf was first used as a ferry landing as part of the San Francisco and Oakland Railroad service. On November 8, 1869, it succeeded Alameda Terminal and became the western terminus of the First transcontinental railroad trains.

Central Pacific 
In 1868 the Central Pacific Railroad acquired this pier which it renamed the Oakland Long Wharf and immediately began extending and improving it, fully opening for business on January 16, 1871. The first through train on the transcontinental route left Oakland on the morning of November 8, 1869, with the inaugural west bound arrival at the Oakland pier that evening. Local commuter trains also used the pier, while trains of the Pacific Railroad (aka: "First transcontinental railroad") used another wharf in nearby Alameda for about two months in 1869 (September 6 to November 7), after which the Oakland Long Wharf became the western terminus of the Pacific Railroad as well. From there San Francisco Bay ferries carried both commuters and long distance passengers between the Long Wharf and San Francisco. The CPRR floated freight to San Francisco starting in 1871. Part of the wharf was filled in between 1879 and 1882, creating the Oakland Mole and Pier, which opened for traffic on January 22, 1882. A large depot covered in corrugated iron and glass, and lit by electric lighting was constructed. It opened in February 1881.

Southern Pacific 

The Central Pacific's operations were consolidated under the Southern Pacific in the 1880s, and in 1882 the Oakland Pier was opened about a half-mile east of the west end of the Long Wharf, which was then used only for freight until being abandoned in 1919. Freight trains served docks just south of the train shed after the original was abandoned. The mole became one of the busiest piers in the United States. A huge stained-glass window of the SP logo was placed on the western end of the train shed in 1929. When the building was demolished, it was removed and put in storage. It is now at the California State Railroad Museum in Sacramento, California.

For decades, Oakland Pier was the main intercity connection to San Francisco. SP operated ferries between the San Francisco Ferry Building and Oakland Pier for passengers traveling between San Francisco and intercity destinations to the east (Chicago) and north (Seattle). Some San Francisco-Los Angeles Coast Route trains had Oakland sections (that combined with the San Francisco sections at San Jose) and these also departed from Oakland Pier. Between 1949 and 1958, Oakland Pier served as the terminal of Western Pacific Railroad's California Zephyr.

Commuter trains 

After January 15, 1939 the electric commuter trains of the East Bay Electric Lines, by then called the Interurban Electric Railway, no longer ran to Oakland Pier but instead used tracks on the lower deck of the new San Francisco-Oakland Bay Bridge, running to the Transbay Terminal in San Francisco. The IER trains were discontinued by Southern Pacific in July 1941. Oakland Pier and the trans bay ferries were discontinued for intercity passenger trains in April 1958. The San Francisco–Oakland ferry service was replaced with buses over the Bay Bridge between San Francisco's Third and Townsend Depot and 16th Street Station, two miles from Oakland Pier.

Demolition
Throughout the pier's existence, progressively greater portions of the bayshore tidelands were filled in.  It was demolished in the 1960s to make way for an expansion of the growing container ship facilities of the Port of Oakland. The only structure that remains of the Oakland Long Wharf is the SP Mole's switchman's tower, which was restored and moved to Middle Harbor Shoreline Park.

Nearby railroad wharves
In order from north to south, the other moles and wharves along the Oakland shore have included:

 The Key System Pier and Mole, which extended from Yerba Buena Avenue nearly to Yerba Buena Island (built on the site of the original California and Nevada Railroad wharf). The area is now Judge John Sutter Regional Shoreline. 
 Oakland Long Wharf/The Oakland Mole and Pier
 The Western Pacific Mole began construction in 1906 and opened for business in 1910. It operated until 1933, and the passenger terminal was demolished in 1940. The area is now the Middle Harbor Shoreline Park.
 The Alameda Mole existed from 1876 to the 1930s and was used to connect San Francisco to Santa Cruz via a narrow-gauge railroad, initially owned by the South Pacific Coast Railroad, which was purchased by Southern Pacific in 1878. It was also used by Red Line trolley cars, and in the 1930s Pan American built a seaplane port at the base of the mole.
 The Alameda Terminal and wharf, at the foot of Pacific Avenue in Alameda, was part of the San Francisco and Alameda Railroad (1863–1870) and became the original western terminus of the First transcontinental railroad on September 6, 1869, when the first Western Pacific through train from Sacramento arrived at Alameda Terminal.

In popular culture
The mole in its latter years can be seen at the beginning of the 1957 movie Pal Joey as Frank Sinatra's character arrives by train and makes his way to the ferry. It also appears in the 1952 noir film "Sudden Fear" starring Joan Crawford.

See also
 Ferries of San Francisco Bay

References

Bibliography

External links 

Middle Harbor Shoreline Park map
Photo: Oakland Long Wharf from Goat Island (Yerba Buena Island) 1886
alamedainfo.com
CPRR Museum: Oakland Long Wharf
CPRR Museum: SP Publ. "From Rail to Trail"

Piers in California
History of Oakland, California
San Francisco Bay
Southern Pacific Railroad
Transportation in Oakland, California
Railway stations in Oakland, California